Rai Doc was an Italian Entertainment TV channel owned by RAI and launched on 1 April 2004 on Digital television in Italy.  It had culture-oriented scheduling with programmes dedicated to poetry, arts and movies. It also broadcast Late Night with Conan O'Brien, subtitled in Italian.

From 2005 the channel timeshared its programming with Rai Futura.

The channel was closed on 1 June 2007 with Rai Futura, following a decision by RAI, and replaced by Rai Gulp on the same frequencies.

Doc
Television channels and stations established in 2004
Television channels and stations disestablished in 2007
Italian-language television stations